A special election was held in  on April 26, 1802 to fill a vacancy caused by the 1802 resignation of Benjamin Taliaferro.

 David Meriwether (Democratic-Republican) 86.95%
 Samuel Hammond 7.72%
 William Bryant 2.94%
 Francis Willis 1.02%
 William Stith 0.81%
 Thomas P. Carnes 0.34%
 James MacNeil 0.21%

See also
List of special elections to the United States House of Representatives

References

 https://elections.lib.tufts.edu/catalog/tufts:ga.specialuscongress1.1802

Georgia 1802 04 At-large
Georgia 1802 04 At-large
1802 04 At-large
Georgia At-large 04
United States House of Representatives 04
United States House of Representatives 1802 04 at-large